Salmon Cove is a cove  southeast of McCall Point on the east side of Lallemand Fjord in Graham Land. It was mapped by the Falklands Islands Dependencies Survey from surveys and air photos, 1956–59. It was named by the UK Antarctic Place-names Committee for Eric M.P. Salmon, an assistant Falklands Islands Dependencies Survey meteorologist who spent several seasons in Antarctica between 1950 and 1956, and visited this cove in 1956.

References

Bays of Graham Land